Wang Xian may refer to:

 Wang Xian (sport shooter) (1978-), Chinese sport shooter who competed in the 2000 Summer Olympics
 Wáng Xī' An (1944-), Chinese martial arts practitioner and teacher of the Chen-style t'ai chi ch'uan